Jersey Shore Boca are an American soccer club based in Ocean County, New Jersey.  In 2003, the club joined the USL Premier Development League (PDL), the fourth tier of the American Soccer Pyramid.  After just one season, the team left the league due to financial reasons. They continue to play in the USASA.

They played their home games in the stadium at Ocean County College in the city of Toms River, New Jersey. The team’s colors were white, blue and yellow.

In 2012, Jersey Shore Boca became the first amateur club from New Jersey to qualify for the Lamar Hunt U.S. Open Cup in the modern pro-soccer era.

Year-by-year

Coaches
 David Vaudreuil (2003)
 John Rerup    (2011)
 Mike McCullion (2012)

Stadia
 Stadium at Ocean County College, Toms River, New Jersey 2003

External links
Jersey Shore Boca

Ocean County, New Jersey
Soccer clubs in New Jersey
Defunct Premier Development League teams
2003 establishments in New Jersey